Pencil Test is a 1988 short film created by Apple Inc.'s Advanced Technology Graphics Group to showcase the animation capabilities of Apple's Macintosh II computer line.

Plot
A pencil tool escapes from the Macintosh interface when no one can see it, as it wants to take a closer look at a wooden pencil on the same desk as the computer. Afterwards, it attempts to get back onto the screen but the computer has been turned off by an unseen human presence. The pencil tool finally manages to turn on the computer, but when it tries to return to the software programme, it ends up smacking onto the screen. After the credits, the sound of the screen shattering can be heard.

Production credits
The credits for the short film include Pixar directors John Lasseter, Andrew Stanton, as well as Ratatouille producer Galyn Susman.

References

External links
QuickTime version at the QuickTime Zone
Pencil Test on YouTube
The Making of Pencil Test on YouTube

1988 films
1980s animated short films
Animated films without speech
1980s English-language films
American animated short films
1980s American films